The Valle tree frog (Boana rubracyla)  is a species of frog in the family Hylidae found in Colombia and possibly Ecuador. Its natural habitats are subtropical or tropical moist lowland forests, freshwater marshes, and intermittent freshwater marshes. It is threatened by habitat loss.

References

Boana
Amphibians of Colombia
Amphibians described in 1970
Taxonomy articles created by Polbot